Citywing (a trading name of Citywing Aviation Services Limited) was an Isle of Man-based company that sold seats on scheduled air flights operated under charter. Flights linked several airports in the British Isles, with the company having a base at Isle of Man Airport. Its head office was in Hangar 9 at Isle of Man Airport in Ballasalla.

History

From November 2012, managing director David Buck led a management buyout of Manx2. On 1 January 2013 the assets of Manx2 were acquired by the new company, Citywing, and seats went on sale on the new company's website. The first Citywing-branded flight took off on 2 January 2013.

During 2014, the route network expanded to include flights from Glasgow to the Isle of Man. Citywing took over the Cardiff to Anglesey public service obligation route in January 2016 after the previous operator went bankrupt.

On 23 February 2017, Citywing Flight 502 (a Van Air Let L-410, OK-LAZ) to Belfast from Isle of Man Ronaldsway Airport was forced to turn back due to deteriorating weather conditions. The following day, Van Air lost its route licences. As a result, Citywing contracted Sprint Air for certain flight services on 2 and 3 March. On 10 March 2017, Citywing announced that after Van Air Europe's loss their UK license they had been unable to find a suitable business partner to operate its services. All flights from 11 March 2017 were terminated and the company was put into liquidation. Citywing cited heavy losses after the need to source leased aircraft to replace Van Air Europe on such short notice.

Destinations

Citywing operated regular scheduled flights to and from these destinations before it’s bankruptcy in March 2017

Fleet
As Citywing was a virtual airline without its own aircraft operations license, it leased in respectively chartered aircraft from Van Air Europe for all of its services. The aircraft leased from Van Air Europe were four leased Let L-410s.

Citywing temporarily chartered a Saab 340 from Sprint Air after the loss of its previous Van Air Let L-410s.

Prior to using Van Air Europe aircraft, Citywing leased a BAe Jetstream 31 from Links Air until the latter lost its UK operating licence.

See also
 List of defunct airlines of the United Kingdom

References

External links

 Official Citywing website — (archived)

Defunct airlines of the Isle of Man
Airlines established in 2012
Airlines disestablished in 2017
British companies established in 2012
British companies disestablished in 2017
Defunct airlines of the United Kingdom